Siddheswaritala Institution, also known as STI, is one of the premium institutions in the state of West Bengal of India. The school is noted for its strong academic foundations and its alumni. The school offers education in Bengali medium with English as the second language. Other subjects are taught as per the norms of West Bengal Board of Secondary Education and West Bengal Council of Higher Secondary Education.

References

High schools and secondary schools in West Bengal
Schools in Nadia district
1921 establishments in India
Educational institutions established in 1921